Arethousa is a village and a community and a municipal unit of the Volvi municipality. Before the 2011 local government reform it was part of the municipal unit of Arethousa was an independent municipality. The 2011 census recorded 748 inhabitants in the village, 869 in the community and 2,987 inhabitants in the municipal unit. The community of Arethousa covers an area of 57.021 km2 while the respective municipal unit 214.929 km2.

Administrative division
The community of Arethousa consists of two separate settlements: 
Arethousa (population 748)
Lefkouda (population 121)
The aforementioned population figures are as of 2011.

See also
 List of settlements in the Thessaloniki regional unit

References

Populated places in Thessaloniki (regional unit)